This is a list of Papua New Guinea women's national rugby league team players. 37 players have represented Papua New Guinea Orchids since 2017 starting with Orchid #1 Cathy Neap and the latest being Gemma Schnaubelt in 2019 who is PNG Orchid #37.

Orchids register

References

External links
 
 

 
Papua New Guinea